Xicheng Jiang is a computer engineer with Broadcom Corporation in Irvine, California. He was named a Fellow of the Institute of Electrical and Electronics Engineers (IEEE) in 2014 for his development of communication systems-on-chip products.

References

Fellow Members of the IEEE
Living people
Year of birth missing (living people)
Place of birth missing (living people)
Computer engineers
American electrical engineers